Bozca (Kurmanji: Xirbe Belek) is a Yazidi village located in the Viranşehir district of the Şanlıurfa Province in southeastern Turkey. The village is located ca.  southeast of Viranşehir in southeastern Anatolia.

References 

Villages in Şanlıurfa Province
Yazidi villages in Turkey